The Moseley School of Art on Moseley Road, Balsall Heath, Birmingham, England was built as the first municipal branch School of Art in Birmingham.

The Moseley School of Art was closed by the City of Birmingham Education Committee in 1976. The Moseley School of Art Association was established in 2002 by former student Graeme Collins as a forum and reunion association for past students and teaching staff.

It was designed by W. H. Bidlake in 1899 and opened in 1900. It closed in 1975 and was then used by the British Association of Muslims. It stands directly opposite the Public Library and Baths. It is Grade II* listed.

Notable alumni
 Edward Barker, cartoonist
 Trevor Beattie, advertising
 Ali Campbell, musician, lead singer of UB40
 Christine McVie, musician from Fleetwood Mac
 Ronald Pennell, artist, engraver and sculptor
 Peter Phillips, artist and co-founder of the Pop Art Movement
 David Prentice, artist (painter) and art teacher
 John Walker, painter and printmaker
 Roy Wood, musician known for his work with the bands The Move, Electric Light Orchestra, and Wizzard
 Colin Birch, Window Dresser for Bloomingdales who worked for the likes of Karl Lagerfeld. Born and raised in South Birmingham. Birch passed away aged 38 in 1988.

References

Sources
 Victorian Architecture in Britain - Blue Guide, Julian Orbach, 1987, 
 Britain in Old Photographs: Balsall Heath and Highgate, Past and Present, Alan Hemming & Val Hart, 2003,

External links
 The Moseley School of Art Association

Buildings and structures in Birmingham, West Midlands
Grade II* listed buildings in the West Midlands (county)
William Bidlake buildings